Muborak is a small city located in Qashqadaryo Region of Uzbekistan. The city is the administrative center of Muborak District. Its population is 30,100 (2016).

Muborak originally arose in connection with an oil refinery. It received the status of a city in 1974. The word muborak means "gracious" in Uzbek.

Muborak is currently an important oil and gas city in independent Uzbekistan. It is home to the Muborak Gas Processing Plant, one of the largest of its type in the country. The city is also known for its football team Mashʼal.

History 
According to a local legend, Muborak got its name from the name of the village of Xoʻjamuborak which had been created in honor of the Islamic scholar Abdullah bin al-Mubarak al-Marwazi. The word muborak means "gracious" in Uzbek.

Muborak originally arose in connection with an oil refinery. It was made into a city in 1974.

Geography 

Climate 
Muborak has a cool arid climate (Köppen climate classification BWk). The city has chilly winters, but very hot and dry summers.

Demographics 
Muborak had a population of 30,100 in 2016. Representatives of many ethnic groups can be found in the town. Uzbeks are the largest ethnic group.

Economy 
Muborak was not heavily industrialized during Soviet times: it was a small town specializing in animal husbandry. It has become a notable industrial city in independent Uzbekistan. Currently, it has a large oil and gas industry. The town is home to the Muborak Gas Processing Plant, one of the largest of its type in the country.

Education 
Muborak is home to three colleges and one vocational school. There are also several secondary schools in the city.

Mubarek zone 
The town was the site of the proposed Crimean Tatar Mubarek zone in the 1980s, although said district never came to fruition.

References

Cities and towns built in the Soviet Union
Cities in Uzbekistan
Populated places in Qashqadaryo Region